"Völsungakviða in forna" or "Helgakviða Hundingsbana II" ("The Second Lay of Helgi Hundingsbane") is an Old Norse poem found in the Poetic Edda. It constitutes one of the Helgi lays together with Helgakviða Hundingsbana I and Helgakviða Hjörvarðssonar.

Henry Adams Bellows maintains in his commentaries that it is a patchwork of various poems that do not fit well together, but stanzas 28-37 and 39-50 are held to be among the finest in Old Norse poetry.

The feud with Hunding and his sons
The first section (containing stanzas 1 to 4) introduces Helgi as the son of Sigmund, of the Ylfing and the Völsung clan, and Borghild. They resided at Brálund and they named their son after Helgi Hjörvarðsson. Their clan was in a bloody feud with Hunding and his many sons.

Helgi disguised himself and visited the home of Hunding's family where the only man present was Hunding's son Hæmingr (unknown in any other source). Hunding sent men to Helgi's foster-father Hagal to search for Helgi but Helgi hid by dressing as a female servant working with the mill.

Helgi managed to escape to a warship after which he killed Hunding and earned his name Hundingsbane.

Helgi meets Sigrún
In the second section (containing stanzas 5 to 12), Helgi lay with his war party at Brunarvagar and had slaughtered some rustled cattle on the beach and were eating the meat raw. Then Sigrún, who was Sváfa reborn appeared, and introduced herself as the daughter of king Högne.

Helgi has to challenge Hothbrodd
In the third section (containing stanzas 13 to 20), which is called the Old Völsung Lay, Sigrún's father had promised her to Hothbrodd, the son of king Granmarr.

Sigrún opposed the marriage and sought out Helgi, who was exhausted from a battle in which he had killed Hunding's sons Eyjólfr, Álfr, Hjörvarðr and Hávarðr. The Valkyrie embraced him and kissed him, and Helgi promised her to fight against Granmarr and his sons.

Helgi assembled an army and invaded Granmar's kingdom together with his brother Sinfjötli. They won the battle and Helgi could take Sigrún as his wife with whom he had sons.

Sinfjötli's and Guthmund's flyting
A fifth section (stanzas 22 to 27) consists of a misplaced version of the flyting between Sinfjötli (Helgi's half-brother) and Guthmundr, which probably is older than the one found in Helgakviða Hundingsbana I.

Dagr kills Helgi and is cursed by Sigrún
In the seventh section (containing stanzas 28-37) Sigrún's brother Dagr, who had been spared by vowing allegiance to Helgi, sacrificed to Odin in the hope of getting revenge for Helgi's slaying of his father and brothers. Odin gave Dagr a spear with which Dagr pierced Helgi at a location called Fjöturlundr. Dagr then returned to tell his sister of Helgi's death:

Sigrún avenged her husband by placing on her brother the most horrible curse:

Dagr was banished to live on carrion in the woods and Helgi was buried in a barrow. When Helgi had entered Valhalla Odin asked Helgi to rule over the Einherjar together with himself. There is a stanza which Bellows interprets as a misplaced stanza on the conflict between Helgi and Hunding, but others interpret as Helgi oppressing Hunding in Valhalla:

Helgi's last visit

An eighth section (containing stanzas 39-50) deals with a short visit by Helgi from Valhalla and his meeting with Sigrún in his barrow.

One evening, a maiden told Sigrún that she has seen Helgi ride with a large retinue into his own barrow, and so Sigrún went to the barrow in order to see Helgi. His hair were covered with frost, his body is sullied with blood and his hands were wet. He explained that it was because every tear she had shed had fallen wet and cold on him. In spite of this, she prepared the bed in his mound and they spent a night together.

Before day broke, Helgi had to return to Valhalla. Sigrún returned home and spent the rest of her life waiting in vain for Helgi to return to his barrow one more time. She died early from the sorrow, but she would meet him in the next life when she was the Valkyrie Kára and he was Helgi Haddingjaskati.

Notes

External links
Helgakvitha Hundingsbana II, Translation and commentary by Henry Adams Bellows
The Second Lay of Helgi Gundingcide, Translation by Benjamin Thorpe
Helgakviða Hundingsbana II, Translation by Lee M. Hollander
Helgakviða Hundingsbana önnur, Sophus Bugge's edition of the manuscript text
Völsungakviða in forna (Helgakviða Hundingsbana II), Guðni Jónsson's edition of the text with normalized spelling

Eddic poetry
Sources of Norse mythology
Nibelung tradition